Kunágota is a village in Békés County, in the Southern Great Plain region of south-east Hungary.

On St David’s Day 1 March 2021 a heartfelt gesture was inspired by the people of Kunágota, branded Hungary’s "Welshest" village, to honour the patron saint of Wales and the Welsh people by illuminating a nearby Castle with the national flag of Wales, which has a striking Dragon. To show respect they sung traditional Welsh hymns such as ‘Cwm Rhondda’, and composed a new piece of music called St David’s Mystery. The piece was written by French Hungarian composer George Gondard.

The town had grown very fond of Wales ever since Elizabeth, a Kunágota-born classical singer, returned to her roots from Cardiff and introduced Welsh hymns to the community a few years ago 

In the 19th century, a small Jewish community lived in the village, many of whose members were murdered in the Holocaust

Geography
It covers an area of 63.99 km² and has a population of 2650 people (2015).

References

Populated places in Békés County